The Flamant solution provides expressions for the stresses and displacements in a linear elastic wedge loaded by point forces at its sharp end.  This solution was developed by A. Flamant  in 1892 by modifying the three-dimensional solution of Boussinesq.

The stresses predicted by the Flamant solution are (in polar coordinates)

where  are constants that are determined from the boundary conditions and the geometry of the wedge (i.e., the angles ) and satisfy

where  are the applied forces.
    
The wedge problem is self-similar and has no inherent length scale. Also, all quantities can be expressed in the separated-variable form .

Forces acting on a half-plane 

In that case

Therefore, the stresses are

and the displacements are (using Michell's solution)

The  dependence of the displacements implies that the displacement grows the further one moves from the point of application of the force (and is unbounded at infinity).  This  feature of the Flamant solution is confusing and appears unphysical.  For a discussion of the issue see http://imechanica.org/node/319.

Displacements at the surface of the half-plane 
The displacements in the  directions at the surface of the half-plane are given by

where

 is the Poisson's ratio,  is the shear modulus, and

Derivation of Flamant solution 
Then the Airy stress function can be expressed as

Therefore, from the tables in Michell's solution, we have

The constants  can then, in principle, be determined from the wedge geometry and the applied boundary conditions.

However, the concentrated loads at the vertex are difficult to express in terms of traction boundary conditions because
 the unit outward normal at the vertex is undefined
 the forces are applied at a point (which has zero area) and hence the traction at that point is infinite.

To get around this problem, we consider a bounded region of the wedge and consider equilibrium of the bounded wedge. Let the bounded wedge have two traction free surfaces and a third surface in the form of an arc of a circle with radius . The tractions on the arc are

Next, we examine the force and moment equilibrium in the bounded wedge and get
 

The traction-free boundary conditions on the edges  and  also imply that

except at the point .

If we assume that  everywhere, then the traction-free conditions and the moment equilibrium equation are satisfied and we are left with 

and  along  except at the point .  But the field  everywhere also satisfies the force equilibrium equations.  Hence this must be the solution.  Also, the assumption  implies that .

Therefore,

To find a particular solution for  we have to plug in the expression for  into the force equilibrium equations to get a system of two equations which have to be solved for :

Forces acting on a half-plane 
In that case, the force equilibrium equations take the form

Therefore

The stresses for this situation are

Using the displacement tables from the Michell solution, the displacements for this case are given by

Displacements at the surface of the half-plane 
To find expressions for the displacements at the surface of the half plane, we first find the displacements for positive  and negative  keeping in mind that  along these locations.

For  we have

For  we have

We can make the displacements symmetric around the point of application of the force by adding rigid body displacements (which does not affect the stresses) 

and removing the redundant rigid body displacements

Then the displacements at the surface can be combined and take the form

where

References

See also 
 Michell solution
 Linear elasticity
 Stress (physics)

Elasticity (physics)